William Jerman Scott (4 April 1864 – 18 July 1920) was an English first-class cricketer active 1880–95 who played for Middlesex and Marylebone Cricket Club (MCC). He was born in Hartley Wintney, Hampshire; died in Windsor.

References

1864 births
1920 deaths
English cricketers
Middlesex cricketers
Marylebone Cricket Club cricketers